12374 Rakhat is a background asteroid from the central region of the asteroid belt, approximately  in diameter. It was discovered on 15 May 1994, by American astronomer and software engineer Charles de Saint-Aignan at the Palomar Observatory in California, United States. The asteroid was named for the fictional planet "Rakhat" in the novel The Sparrow

Orbit and classification 

Rakhat is a non-family asteroid from the main belt's background population. It orbits the Sun in the central main-belt at a distance of 1.8–3.3 AU once every 4 years and 1 month (1,488 days). Its orbit has an eccentricity of 0.31 and an inclination of 9° with respect to the ecliptic.

A first precovery was taken at the discovering Palomar Observatory in November 1954, extending the asteroid's observation arc by 40 years prior to its official discovery observation.

Naming 

This minor planet was named "Rakhat" after the fictional planet in the novel The Sparrow by Mary Doria Russell. The novel begins in 2019, when SETI at the Arecibo, picks up radio broadcasts of music from this planet in the vicinity of Alpha Centauri. The first expedition is organized by the Jesuit order, known for its missionary, linguistic and scientific activities. The novel was followed by the sequel Children of God. The approved naming citation was published by the Minor Planet Center on 28 March 2002.

Physical characteristics 

Rakhat is an assumed common S-type asteroid.

In May 2010, a rotational lightcurve was obtained from photometric observations made astronomers at the Palomar Transient Factory in California. It gave a rotation period of  hours with a brightness amplitude of 0.31 in magnitude.

According to the survey carried out by the NEOWISE mission of NASA's space-based Wide-field Infrared Survey Explorer, the asteroid measures 4.6 kilometers in diameter and its surface has an albedo of 0.21, while the Collaborative Asteroid Lightcurve Link assumes a standard albedo for stony asteroids of 0.20 and calculates a diameter of 4.4 kilometers.

References

External links 
 Lightcurve Database Query (LCDB), at www.minorplanet.info
 Dictionary of Minor Planet Names, Google books
 Asteroids and comets rotation curves, CdR – Geneva Observatory, Raoul Behrend
 Discovery Circumstances: Numbered Minor Planets (10001)-(15000) – Minor Planet Center
 
 

012374
Discoveries by Charles de Saint-Aignan
Named minor planets
19940515